The Sulawesi goshawk (Accipiter griseiceps) is a species of bird of prey in the family Accipitridae.  It is endemic to Sulawesi, Indonesia. Its natural habitats are subtropical or tropical moist lowland forest and subtropical or tropical moist montane forest.

References

Endemic birds of Sulawesi
Accipiter
Birds described in 1862
Taxonomy articles created by Polbot